A reserve bank is a public institution that manages a state's currency, money supply, and interest rates.

Reserve Bank may also refer to:

Reserve Bank of Australia
Reserve Bank of Fiji
Reserve Bank of India
Reserve Bank of New Zealand
South African Reserve Bank
Federal Reserve System of the United States
Reserve Bank of Vanuatu
Reserve Bank of Vietnam
Reserve Bank of Zimbabwe

See also
 National bank (disambiguation)
 List of central banks
 Central bank